A gondolier is a Venetian boatman who propels a gondola.

Gondolier may also refer to:

 "Gondolier" (song), a popular 1957 song by Dalida
 Gondolier (album), a 1958 album by Dalida

See also
 The Gondoliers, an 1891 opera by Gilbert and Sullivan